RCO may refer to:

Air Force Rapid Capabilities Office
Recovery Consistency Objective, in computing
Regional Currency Office 
Remote Communications Outlet
Rifle combat optic
Royal College of Organists
Royal Concertgebouw Orchestra, a Dutch orchestra
Rugby Clube de Oeiras